Ectoedemia trinotata is a moth of the family Nepticulidae. It is found in eastern North America.

The wingspan is 4.5–5 mm. There are two generations per year, the mines of the first appearing during the early part of July and those of the second generation at the beginning of September

The larvae feed on Carya cordiformis and Carya ovata. They mine the leaves of their host plant. The mine starts as an extremely narrow linear tract, later suddenly expanding into a broader tract, which in turn becomes a blotch. The mine is almost transparent even in the early linear portion. The larva is of a dull grayish color. The cocoon reddish brown.

References

External links
Nepticulidae of North America

Nepticulidae
Moths of North America

Taxa named by Annette Frances Braun
Leaf miners
Moths described in 1914